Octotapnia is a genus of beetles in the family Cerambycidae, containing the following species:

 Octotapnia ceiaca Galileo & Martins, 1998
 Octotapnia exotica Galileo & Martins, 1992
 Octotapnia mucunaca Galileo & Martins, 1998

References

Oreodera